Doop and the Inside Outlaws is an alternative country, roots rock band from the Detroit, MI area.

Background
Don "Doop" Duprie is a singer-songwriter and front man for the band that he formed in 2007. A laid off firefighter born and raised in industrial River Rouge, Michigan, Doop writes songs that reflect his deep working-class roots. He teamed up with legendary Detroit producer Jim Diamond at Ghetto Recorders to record the band's three albums. Current members of the band include Pete Ballard on the pedal steel guitar, Katie Grace on bass and Danny Kanka on drums.

Discography
Blood River, released July 2007
Everett Belcher, released August 2009
What am I supposed to do?, released October 2011

Awards
Doop has garnered multiple Detroit Music Awards nominations for Country Artist, Songwriter, Vocalist and for the first two albums. The band won the 2010 Detroit Music Awards ‘Outstanding Country Recording’ award for “Everett Belcher.”

National Recognition
Doop was a featured guest interview on the American Public Media radio show The Story with Dick Gordon and the award-winning podcast Digivegas.com. The albums made the Top Ten Lists in Metro Times and Americana Roots.com, and acquired many favorable reviews from music magazines and websites across the globe. His songs were also featured on the 1 rated Americana podcast, “Americana Roots Roundtable” on No Depression.com and Country Music Pride's podcast Americana Daily named “Everett Belcher” the “Album of the Day.”

References

External links
 Doop and the Inside Outlaws Official Web Site
  Doop talks with Dick Gordon of The Story about expressing economic frustration through music.

American alternative country groups
Musical groups from Detroit
Musical groups established in 2007
2007 establishments in Michigan